Craspedodiscus elegans is a species of diatoms in the genus Craspedodiscus. It is the type-species in the genus.

References

External links

 Picture on www.microscopyview.com
 Picture on forum.mikroscopia.com (French)
 Craspedodiscus elegans at AlgaeBase

Species described in 1844
Coscinodiscophyceae